Villa Duchesne is an independent, Roman Catholic school in Frontenac, Missouri, United States linked with 147 schools in 30 countries through the International Network of Sacred Heart Schools. Villa Duchesne is coed in preschool and elementary and all-girls in grades 7-12. The preschool/elementary program was formerly called Oak Hill School. 

It was named for Sister Rose Philippine Duchesne.

Sport
Villa Duchesne sports include field hockey, volleyball, tennis, lacrosse, soccer, golf, basketball, swimming and diving, cross country, and track and field. In 2010, Villa Duchesne won the MSHSAA golf state championship. Villa Duchesne is also well known for its field hockey program, and the St. Joseph's vs. Villa Duchesne field hockey game is a popular rivalry game.

In 2011, Villa Duchesne captured the Missouri Class 3A Volleyball Championship led by a core group of seniors who helped the team to a 2nd-place finish in 2009.

While Villa's teams compete under the "Saints" name, it is not uncommon to see the school's mascot, Sophie the Squirrel, at home games and meets.

Reigning MSHSAA Field Hockey champions for the 2017 and 2018 seasons, defeating MICDS both years.

Tradition
Villa Duchesne places a large emphasis on tradition, specifically on Sacre Coeur and French tradition. Some traditions are Conge, the family picnic, gouter, and cache-cache.

Notable alumni
Dave Holmes, TV personality, actor, blogger, writer.
Emily W. Murphy, Attorney and Administrator of the General Services Administration.

References

External links
 Independent schools of St. Louis

Educational institutions established in 1929
Girls' schools in Missouri
Private K-12 schools in Missouri
Roman Catholic Archdiocese of St. Louis
Roman Catholic secondary schools in St. Louis County, Missouri
Sacred Heart schools in the United States
1929 establishments in Missouri
Buildings and structures in St. Louis County, Missouri